Netto is a 2005 film directed by Robert Thalheim. It is a story of father-son relationship in post-unification Berlin. The song "Mein bester Kumpel" by Peter Tschernig is used throughout the film.

Cast
Milan Peschel as Marcel Werner
Sebastian Butz as Sebastian Werner
Stephanie Charlotta Koetz as Nora
Christina Grosse as Angelika
Bernd Lambrecht as Bernd

External links

2005 films
2005 comedy films
German comedy films
2000s German-language films
Films set in Berlin
2000s German films